is a Japanese light novel series written by Kurokata and illustrated by KeG. It began serialization online in March 2014 on the user-generated novel publishing website Shōsetsuka ni Narō. It was later acquired by Media Factory, who have published twelve volumes between March 2016 and March 2020 under their MF Books imprint. A manga adaptation with art by Reki Kugayama has been serialized in Kadokawa Shoten's seinen manga magazine Comp Ace since April 2017. It has been collected in eleven tankōbon volumes. Both the light novel and manga are licensed in North America by One Peace Books. An anime adaptation has been announced.

Media

Light novels
The series written by Kurokata began serialization online in March 2014 on the user-generated novel publishing website Shōsetsuka ni Narō. It was later acquired by Media Factory, who have published twelve volumes with illustrations by KeG between March 2016 and March 2020 under their MF Books imprint. The light novel is licensed in North America by One Peace Books.

Manga
A manga adaptation with art by Reki Kugayama began serialization on Kadokawa Shoten's Comp Ace magazine on April 26, 2017. It has been collected in eleven tankōbon volumes as of October 25, 2022. The manga adaptation is also licensed in North America by One Peace Books.

Anime
An anime adaptation was announced during the MF Books 8th Anniversary livestream event on August 15, 2021.

References

External links
  at Shōsetsuka ni Narō 
  
  
 

2016 Japanese novels
Anime and manga based on light novels
Comedy anime and manga
Isekai anime and manga
Isekai novels and light novels
Kadokawa Dwango franchises
Kadokawa Shoten manga
Light novels
Light novels first published online
Seinen manga
Shōsetsuka ni Narō